German wine regions are classified according to the quality category of the wine grown therein: Tafelwein, Landwein, Qualitätswein bestimmter Anbaugebiete (QbA) and Prädikatswein. The wine regions allowed to produce QbA and Prädikatswein are further subdivided into four categories according to size: Anbaugebiet (a major wine region), Bereich (a district within the wine region), Großlage (a collection of vineyards within a district) and Einzellage (a single vineyard). A small number of Einzellagen do not belong to a Großlage and are called "großlagenfrei", but all belong to a Bereich and Anbaugebiet.

The 13 major wine regions (Anbaugebiete) are Ahr, Baden, Franconia, Hessische Bergstraße, Mittelrhein, Mosel, Nahe, Palatinate, Rheingau, Rheinhessen, Saale-Unstrut, Saxony, and Württemberg. With the exceptions of Saxony and Saale-Unstrut, most of Germany's major wine regions are located in the western part of the country. As of 2010, there were 41 Bereiche, 160 Großlagen and 2,632 Einzellagen.

Ahr
In the Ahr there is 1 Bereich (in bold) and 1 Großlage.
Walporzheim/Ahrtal
 Klosterberg

Baden
In the Baden there are 9 Bereiche (in bold) and 16 Großlagen.
Badische Bergstraße
 Hohenberg
 Mannaberg
 Rittersberg
 Stiftsberg
Bodensee
 Sonnenufer
Breisgau
 Burg Lichteneck
 Burg Zähringen
 Schutterlindenberg
Kaiserstuhl
 Vulkanfelsen
Kraichgau
Markgräflerland
 Attilafelsen
 Burg Neuenfels
 Lorettoberg
 Vogtei Rötteln
Ortenau
 Fürsteneck
 Schloss Rodeck
Tauberfranken
 Tauberklinge
Tuniberg

Franconia
In Franconia, also known as Franken, there are 3 Bereiche (in bold) and 22 Großlagen. 2 Einzellagen are großlagenfrei.
Maindreieck
 Burg
 Engelsberg
 Ewig Leben
 Hofrat
 Honigberg
 Kirchberg
 Marienberg
 Markgraf Babenberg
 Oelspiel
 Ravensburg
 Rosstal
 Teufelstor
Mainviereck
 Heiligenthal
 Reuschberg
Steigerwald
 Burgweg-Franken
 Herrenberg
 Kapellenberg
 Schild
 Schlossberg
 Schlosstück

Hessische Bergstraße
In the Hessische Bergstraße there are 2 Bereiche (in bold) and 3 Großlagen. 
Starkenburg
 Rott
 Schlossberg
 Wolfsmagen
Umstadt

Mittelrhein
In the Mittelrhein there are 2 Bereiche (in bold) and 12 Großlagen. 
Loreley
 Burg Hammerstein
 Burg Rheinfels
 Gedeonseck
 Schloss Herrenberg
 Lahntal
 Loreleyfelsen
 Marksburg
 Schloss Reichenstein
 Schloss Schönburg
 Schloss Stahleck
Siebengebirge
 Petersberg

Mosel

In the Mosel there are 6 Bereiche (in bold) and 19 Großlagen. 
Bernkastel
 Badstube
 Kurfürstlay
 Michelsberg
 Münzlay
 Nacktarsch
 Probstberg
 St. Michael
 Schwarzlay
 Vom Heissen Stein
Burg Cochem
 Goldbäumchen
 Gradschaft
 Rosenhang
 Schwarze Katz
 Weinhex
Moseltor
 Schloss Bübinger
Obermosel
 Gipfel
 Königsberg
Ruwertal
 Römerlay
Saar
 Scharzberg

Nahe
In the Nahe there is 1 Bereich (in bold) and 7 Großlagen. 
Nahetal
 Burgweg-Nahe
 Kronenberg
 Paradiesgarten
 Pfarrgarten
 Rosengarten
 Schlosskapelle
 Sonnenborn

Palatinate
In the Palatinate, also known as Pfalz, there are 2 Bereiche (in bold) and 25 Großlagen. 
Mittelhaardt-Deutsche Weinstraße
 Feuerberg
 Gradenstück
 Hochmess
 Hofstück
 Höllenpfad
 Honigsäckel
 Kobnert
 Mariengarten
 Meerspinne
 Pfaffengrund
 Rebstöckel
 Rosenbühl
 Schenkenböhl
 Schnepfenflug an der Weinstraße
 Schnepfenflug vom Zellertal
 Schwarzerde
Südliche Weinstraße
 Bischofskreuz
 Guttenberg
 Herrlich
 Kloster Liebrauenberg
 Königsgarten
 Mandelhöhe
 Ordensgut
 Schloss Ludwigshöhe
 Trappenberg

Rheingau

In the Rheingau there is 1 Bereich (in bold) and 10 Großlagen. 
Johannisberg
 Burgweg-Rheingau
 Daubhaus
 Deutelsberg
 Erntebringer
 Gottesthal
 Heiligenstock
 Honigberg
 Mehrhölzchen
 Steil
 Steinmächer

Rheinhessen
In the Rheinhessen there are 3 Bereiche (in bold) and 24 Großlagen. 
Bingen
 Abtey
 Adelberg
 Kaiserpfalz
 Kurfüstenstück
 Rheingrafenstein
 Sankt Rochuskapelle
Nierstein
 Auflangen
 Domherr
 Güldenmorgen
 Gutes Domtal
 Krötenbrunnen
 Petersberg
 Rehbach
 Rheinblick
 Sankt Alban
 Spiegelberg
 Vogelsgärten
Wonnegau
 Bergkloster
 Burg Rodenstein
 Domblick
 Gotteshilfe
 Liebfrauenmorgen
 Pilgerpfad
 Sybillinenstein

Saale-Unstrut
In Saale-Unstrut there are 2 Bereiche (in bold) and 5 Großlagen. 
Schlossneuenburg
 Blütengrund
 Göttersitz
 Kelterberg
 Schweigenberg
Thüringen
 Mark Brandenburg

Saxony
In Saxony, also known as Sachsen, there are 3 Bereiche (in bold) and 4 Großlagen. 
Dresden
 Elbhänge
 Lössnitz
Elstertal
Meissen
 Schloss-Weinberg
 Spaargebirge

Württemberg
In Württemberg there are 6 Bereiche (in bold) and 17 Großlagen. 
Bayerischer Bodensee
 Lindauer Seegarten
Kocher-Jagst-Tauber
 Kocherberg
 Tauberberg
Oberer Neckar
Remstal-Stuttgart
 Hohenneuffen
 Kopf
 Sonnenbühl
 Wartbühl
 Weinsteige
Württembergisch Bodensee
Württembergisch Unterland
 Heuchelberg
 Kirchenweinberg
 Lindelberg
 Salzberg
 Schalkstein
 Schozachtal
 Staufenberg
 Stromberg
 Wunnenstein

Tafelwein regions
There are 4 main wine regions that produce German Tafelwein and 8 sub-regions.
Rhein-Mosel-sub-regions
 Rhein
 Mosel
 Saar
Bayern-sub regions
 Main
 Donau
 Lindau
Neckar Oberrhein-sub regions
 Burgengau
 Römertor
Stargarder Land

Landwein regions
There are 20 wine regions that produce German Landwein. The Anbaugebiet where the region is located in is in parenthesis.
 Ahrtaler (Ahr)
 Sübadischer  (Baden)
 Unterbadischer (Baden)
 Taubertäler (Baden)
 Fränkischer (Franconia)
 Regensburger (Franconia)
 Starkenburger (Hessische Bergstraße)
 Rheinburgen (Mittelrhein)
 Landwein der Mosel (Mosel)
 Saarländischer (Mosel)
 Landwein der Ruwer (Mosel)
 Nahegauer (Nahe)
 Pfälzer (Palatinate)
 Altrheingauer (Rheingau)
 Rheinischer (Rheinhessen)
 Mitteldeutscher (Saale-Unstrut)
 Sächsischer (Saxony)
 Bayerischer Bodensee (Württemberg)
 Schwäbischer (Württemberg)
 Mecklenburger

References

German wine
Wine regions of Germany
Win
Wine-related lists
wine regions